The 29th PMPC Star Awards for Television (organized by Philippine Movie Press Club headed by current president and over-all awards chairman Joe Barrameda and produced by Airtime Marketing Philippines, Inc. headed by Tessie Celestino-Howard) awarding ceremony was held on December 3, 2015, at the Kia Theatre, Araneta Center, Cubao, Quezon City and will be broadcast on ABS-CBN Channel 2 on December 6, 2015 ("Sunday's Best", 11:15pm). The awards night is hosted by Boy Abunda, Gelli de Belen, Maja Salvador, Enchong Dee, Christian Bautista and Toni Gonzaga, with opening number performed by Grae Fernandez, Ataska Mercado, Bailey May, Ylona Garcia, and  additional musical performances from  Christian Bautista, Klarisse de Guzman, Darren Espanto, Sofia Andres, Rodjun Cruz, Ella Cruz, and a tribute number for the Lifetime Achievement Awardees will be performed by Mark Mabasa, Lucky Robles, Lilibeth Garcia and JV Decena. The awards night will be under the direction of Mr. Bert de Leon.

Nominees & Winners 
These are the nominations list (in alphabetical order) for the awarding ceremony. (period: July 1, 2014, to June 29, 2015) Winners are listed first and highlighted with boldface.

Stations

Programs

Personalities

Notes:
 To focused on original TV creations, the PMPC had decided that franchised local programs (drama adaptations, reality, children's, and game shows) and drama remakes (including Yagit and Pangako Sa Yo) were not nominated. Actors and hosts who part of the cast in these programs are only included in the list.
 PMPC Hall of Famers who won 15 times in a row including Maalaala Mo Kaya (Best Drama Anthology), Eat Bulaga! (Best Musical Variety Show), Bubble Gang (Best Gag Show) and Boy Abunda (Best Male Showbiz-Oriented Talk Show Host except on his other categories as "Best Celebrity Talk Show Host" & "Best Public Affairs Program Host".) were also excluded in the nominees list of their respective categories. Hosts and Actors from the three Hall of Famers shows are also included in the list.

Rundown
Number of Nominees

Number of Winners (excluding Special Awards)

Special awards

Ading Fernando Lifetime Achievement Award 
 Coney Reyes

Excellence in Broadcasting Award 
 Maria A. Ressa (Founder and CEO of Rappler and Former Head of ABS-CBN News and Current Affairs)

German Moreno's Power Tandem Award 
 "Aldub" (Alden Richards and Maine Mendoza)
 "LizQuen" (Liza Soberano and Enrique Gil)

Star of the Night 
 Male Star of the Night: Bailey May
 Female Star of the Night: Ylona Garcia

See also 
PMPC Star Awards for Television
2015 in Philippine television
7th PMPC Star Awards for Music

References 

PMPC Star Awards for Television
2015 in Philippine television